"The Day" is a single by South Korean singers K.Will and Baekhyun, member of South Korean boy group EXO. The song was released  by SM Entertainment on May 13, 2016, through SM Station.

Background and release 
On May 9, 2016, SM shared a teaser photo with images of Baekhyun only for the collaboration. On May 10, it was revealed via a teaser image that the artist that will collaborate with Baekhyun would be K.Will.

Produced by Miss Kay and Kim Jae-hyung, "The Day" is described as a ballad song combined with acoustic guitar about yearning for a lost love.

Music video 
The music video for "The Day" was released on May 13, 2016. In it, a man is seen being confronted with happy memories from the past while regretting his decisions. Although Baekhyun and K.Will do not take lead roles in the music video, they are seen singing emotionally against a black backdrop throughout the video.

Track listing

Charts

Weekly charts

Monthly charts

Sales

Release history

References 

Baekhyun songs
2016 songs
2016 singles
Korean-language songs
SM Entertainment singles